Arun Joshi (1939-1993) was an Indian writer. He is known for his novels The Strange Case of Billy Biswas  and The Apprentice. He won the Sahitya Akademi Award for his novel  The Last Labyrinth in 1982. His novels have characters who are urban, English speaking and disturbed for some reason. According to one commentator, "The shallowness of middle class society is not for him a point of rhetoric, intended to show off his own enlightened superiority, but a theme to be explored with actual concern."

Life

Arun Joshi was raised in Varanasi, Uttar Pradesh, where his father A C Joshi was Vice Chancellor of Banaras Hindu University.

On returning to India, he began working at Delhi Cloth & General Mills, North India's first textile factory and among the earliest joint-stock companies of the country, as chief of its recruitment and training department. He married Rukmini Lal, a daughter of a shareholder. He resigned from D.C.M. in 1965 while continuing to be the executive director of Shri Ram Centre for Industrial Relations and Human Resources in Delhi.

Joshi lived a reclusive life and generally avoided publicity.

The Foreigner 
The Foreigner was published in 1968.

The Strange Case of Billy Biswas 
The Strange Case of Billy Biswas was written in 1971 and tells the story of a US returned Indian named Billy Biswas.

Works

Novels
The Foreigner, 1968
The Strange Case of Billy Biswas, 1971
The Apprentice, 1974
The Last Labyrinth, 1981
The City and the River, 1990

Short stories
The Survivor and Other Stories, 1975.
The Only American From Our Village.

Other
Shri Ram: A Biography, with Khushwant Singh, 1968. 
Laia Shri Ram: A Study in Entrepreneurship and Industrial Management, 1975.

See also
 List of Indian writers

External links
Arun Joshi on Literary Encyclopaedia

References

20th-century Indian novelists
1939 births
1993 deaths
Recipients of the Sahitya Akademi Award in English
20th-century Indian short story writers
Writers from Varanasi
Novelists from Uttar Pradesh